Konrad Hallenbarter (born December 1, 1953 in Obergesteln) is a Swiss cross-country skier who competed in the 1980s. At the 1984 Winter Olympics in Sarajevo, he finished fifth in the 4 x 10 km relay and ninth in the 50 km events.

Hallenbarter's best individual finish at the FIS Nordic World Ski Championships was tenth in the 30 km event at Seefeld in 1985. His best World Cup finish was fifth in a 30 km event in Austria in 1983.

In 1983, he won Vasaloppet. Hallenbarter was the first man to complete the race in under 4 hours, with a time of 3.58.08.

Cross-country skiing results
All results are sourced from the International Ski Federation (FIS).

Olympic Games

World Championships

World Cup

Season standings

References

External links

1953 births
Living people
Swiss male cross-country skiers
Olympic cross-country skiers of Switzerland
Cross-country skiers at the 1980 Winter Olympics
Cross-country skiers at the 1984 Winter Olympics
Cross-country skiers at the 1988 Winter Olympics
20th-century Swiss people